Lasting almost 50 years, Les Folies Bergere was the longest running show in Las Vegas history.

The Folies Bergere revue was imported directly from Paris including French creative leadership and cast members.

The Tropicana Hotel in Las Vegas hosted the progeny production by emulating the original Folies Bergere of Paris’ successful formula of featuring topless, statuesque showgirls, chorus line dancers, elaborate stage sets, with interludes of comedy, magic, acrobats, and animal acts. The main components of the show incorporated ornate costumes with immense headpieces adorned with exotic bird feathers and expertly crafted rhinestones, expansive and elaborate scenery, original music performed by live orchestras, and imaginative interpretations of historic periods with the respective dance styles of the era.

The spectacular combined the sexy mystique of Paris, the glamor and glitz of Hollywood, and the cosmopolitan sophistication of New York City.

The prominence of showgirls established their role as one of the most recognizable icons of Las Vegas. In their best years, showgirls acted as Las Vegas ambassadors appearing at openings, store and event promotions, in printed advertisements, and alongside Mayor Oscar Goodman (and former mob attorney) at public appearances. To this day, showgirls define present-day Las Vegas and their influence can be seen in public artwork, marketing campaigns, and sidewalk impressionists.

The Tropicana produced the extravaganza, Folies Bergere, in an age when casinos invested in unprofitable shows to attract tourists and encourage gambling on their gaming floor. Over the years, as corporations took over ownership of casinos and resorts, everything from entertainment, lodging, restaurants, and even parking had become independent cost centers that were expected to be self-funded. The over-the-top, expensive showgirl revues had become a historical phenomena, viewable in museum exhibits, and kept alive in the hearts and memories of longtime Las Vegas visitors.

Background 
The first Folies Bergere of Paris originated in 1869 as a cabaret music hall. The institution is still in business, and remains a strong symbol of French and Parisian life. It is most notably captured in the painting “A Bar at the Folies Bergère” by French Impressionist artist Édouard Manet.

The theater changed direction during World War I, when there was a new focus on the (frontal) nude female. Michel Gyarmathy, a pre-war Hungarian refugee, became artistic director of the most celebrated Folies Bergere in Paris. "Monsieur Michel," as he was known to his staff, designed the production, involving dozens of sets and more than 1,000 costumes from Parisian couturiers. Gyarmathy recruited female talent to perform in the company along with the acrobats, magicians, singers, tightrope walkers, circus animals, and other cabaret acts that provided variation to the nude main attraction.

Gyarmathy was personally involved in replicating the show for the Tropicana in Las Vegas. Although the show was portrayed as “Direct from Paris,” half of the showgirls were American due to union agreements.

Ordinarily, a show business career does not offer consistent employment. However, Folies Bergere's longevity offered some stability for cast and staff. Notwithstanding, the cast was subject to regular auditions twice annually, so their positions were not guaranteed. Also, showgirl employment covenants stipulated that they maintain their hiring body weight, have no tan lines and no tattoos. Violations to the excess poundage clause were subject to written warnings in the form of a “Personal Appearance Notice.”

Mary Leo, showgirl and line captain for Folies Bergere, shared her experiences during an oral history interview for the University of Nevada Las Vegas, Special Collections. She described how showgirl lifestyles consistently fell into three categories. The first group consisted of married women with a family. For them, being a showgirl was simply a job. They would go home between twice daily performances to tend to their children and were available for the morning routine of getting the kids ready for school. The second group Leo referred to as “Professional Gypsies.” These women loved show business, traveling and entertaining. The final group Leo described as the “Come and Go” set. They tended to be more transient and were attracted to the glamor of Las Vegas, wanted to encounter movie stars, and desired to betroth a wealthy man.

Showgirls had a reputation for lacking intelligence, acting immorally, and not being interested in the more traditional long term goals of more stable careers and/or marriage. However, this perception may not have always been true, and in fact this persona was likely perpetuated by the show management's request that showgirls “mix” or mingle with guests after the performance. In fact, former showgirls were generally young when they started performing, and following their Folies Bergere tenure, many pursued university education, obtained professional employment in various fields, and engaged in long-term relationships.

Showgirls were typically 5’10"-6’2”(178-188 cm) tall, donned 2-4 inch (5-10 cm)high heeled shoes, headdresses nearing 4 feet (120 cm) tall, and backpacks that supported the tropical plumage display up to a 10-foot (3 m) wingspan weighing upwards of 65 pounds (30 kilo). Showgirls needed to have both a dancer's gracefulness and athlete's strength as they showcased their poise by descending the grand staircases and circumnavigating the stage effortlessly with an alluring smile.

Many of the productions and individual scenes had themes based on historical periods. The costumes, sets, and dance styles were researched using museum exhibits along with consultations with experts in garment design and construction techniques. The period apparel was then interpreted and modified to allow for dance movements.

Jerry Jackson, Folies Bergere director, donated costume sketches, original music compositions, newspaper clippings, photographs and other memorabilia to the UNLV Special Collections that are cited in this article and are available for public viewing on request. Jackson also contributed several costumes to the Nevada State Museum. Museum exhibitions have offered a peek behind the velvet curtain presenting costumes, archival photographs, and design renderings.

As a side note, there was a world-wide rhinestone shortage that was supposedly precipitated by the 1981 Jubilee! showgirl revue's expansive costume application of the cut glass. The show had ordered all the available rhinestones produced by Swarovski for their outfits and sets.

History

The Paris Connection 
J. Kell Housells gained a majority share in the Tropicana in 1959. As owner, one of his first key initiatives was to was bring the Folies Bergere to the Tropicana.

The Folies Bergere spectacular was a cause célèbre depicting frontal nudity and provocative dance moves. It is claimed to have had an annual attendance of over 600,000 guests at the height of its popularity. Entertainment director Lou Walters is credited as the individual responsible for securing the rights from Paris for the Tropicana. The Paris Can-Can line dance is considered to have made Folies Bergere Paris world renown and was freely adapted for the American audience.

"The Trop," as it was affectionately known, was considered the "Tiffany of the Strip," drawing in celebrities like Sammy Davis Jr., Frank Sinatra and Dean Martin. Hotel guests came to hobnob with the stars and the Folies' showgirls who would "dress up'' the lounge after performances.

Initially, the costumes were crafted in Paris for importing to Las Vegas. According to US customs laws, after three years, a duty payment of half the value was due if the items were retained. Another option was to return the costumes to Paris. The chosen alternative was to burn the costumes in the desert under the watchful eyes of the federal officials. Those were sad days for Folies Bergere staff.

Another anecdote was imparted by Lance Burton, a Folies Bergere magician, concerning Siegfried and Roy's first job in Vegas at the Folies Bergere: “They had this cheetah. One time it jumped into the musician's pit. The musicians all went diving for cover. And Siegfried said to the piano player, 'Keep playing -- he likes the music.’”

The Folies Bergere was staged at the Hotel Tropicana’s Fountain Theatre from 1959 to 1975. Featuring pink architectural accents, furniture, and stage curtains, the venue was nicknamed “the pink room.” Raised stage platforms and stairs offered the audience an intimate experience. The open orchestra pit would prove to be so precarious for the performers that, eventually, a preventative net was installed to catch the cast when one of them inadvertently stepped off the stage, slipping into the pit.

Maitre’ds were prepared to show guests to their seats, locating them partially based on the size of the gratuity. Guests frequently wore more formal dress - suits for men and evening dresses for women (with bouffant-styled hair in the 1970s). Hotel flower girls and cigarette girls roamed the aisles plying their wares. Photographers were on hand and ready to commemorate the occasion.

Tropicana in transition 
In the early 1970s, the Tropicana did not effectively compete with the bigger hotels in Las Vegas. The property had changed hands a few times before Mitzi Stauffer Briggs, heir to the Stauffer Chemical fortune, bought a majority stake in the Tropicana in 1975. At the outset, she was not aware of the uncollectable debt associated with gambling credits. Mob figure Joseph Agosto, owning the rights to Folies Bergere, took advantage of her misfortune by proffering her mob loans in exchange for management involvement. Considering Agosto's criminal past, he would not otherwise be licensable as a casino employee. It would later be discovered that Agosto was siphoning Folies Bergere and casino profits. Due to the association with Agosto, Briggs was forced to sell the Tropicana Hotel to Ramada Inns in December 1979. "The Folies Bergere is really a symbol of the connection between the mob and the Tropicana, via the Folies Bergere," sums up Karan Feder.

During this period, ties were cut with Folies Bergere of Paris. Jerry Jackson was promoted to Head Director and Choreographer. The show permanently relocated from the Fountain Theatre to the new Tiffany Theatre within the Tropicana. The revamped version was titled “Le Music Hall”. The period theme utilized elaborate sets, exquisite wardrobes, and an ageless symbol of luxury, a 1930s Rolls Royce. Some dancers remembered the Rolls Royce as being an occupational hazard as it leaked oil, causing the floor surface to be tenuous for dance routines.

After the Mob 
The legalization of gambling in Atlantic City, New Jersey in 1978 created competition for the Las Vegas casinos. By the 1990s, Las Vegas was experiencing an economic downturn. In an effort to attract more visitors, Las Vegas promoted itself as family-friendly. The Las Vegas campaign targeted the family demographic supported by attractions such as the live pirate ship performance at Treasure Island, the hourly volcano eruption at the Mirage, the Shark Reef Aquarium at Mandalay Bay, and high-powered water cannons choreographed to match accompanying music at the Fountains of Bellagio. The Tropicana was one of the hotels that did not participate in the effort, choosing “rollers over strollers.”

The Folies Bergere was subject to labor action in 1989 as the orchestra's union elected to strike after unsuccessful contract negotiations. Once the live music had stopped, the musicians were replaced with a recorded soundtrack, vacating the orchestra pit from that point forward.

The Rhinestones Lost Their Luster 
The Tropicana and its parent company filed for bankruptcy during the global financial crisis of 2008. Tropicana was purchased and reorganized under new ownership in 2009, leaving no financial resources to subsidize Folies Bergere and subsequently issue termination notices. On March 28, 2009, cast, crew, and staff took their final curtain call.

Proposed reasons for the decline of Folies Bergere and showgirl revues in general:

 Lack of innovation. There was a desire for something new as showgirl revues appeared dated and old-fashioned. 
 Lack of reinvestment. The paucity of ongoing investment was a major factor in longer times between show revisions and less extravagance in the show itself.
 Topless became less of a novelty. Stripclubs and other topless entertainment became ubiquitous in Las Vegas. 
 Transition from hotel sponsorship to external financing. "Folies" along with Bally's "Jubilee!,” was one of the last in-house productions, in which cast and crew were direct employees of the casino. Most casinos now outsource with third party producers who foot production expenses and compensate team members.
 Faced with competition. A number of shows were available, including five popular Cirque du Soleil shows at that time. 
 Tropicana curse. Scott Roeben, a Las Vegas provocateur and pundit, coined this phrase to describe the multiple show failings at the Tropicana.

Legacy 
Today, showgirls are a living cultural symbol of Las Vegas' past.

Many buskers mimic showgirl feather and sequin attire, posing for pictures with tourists for gratuities, or distributing pamphlets for time-share promotions.

Art Installations 
Located at Las Vegas's Harry Reid International Airport resides the “Folies in Flight” art installation. Terry Ritter, former Las Vegas show entertainer turned artist immortalized showgirls in this mural honoring and celebrating their accomplishments and grandeur.

At 50 feet (15 m) high, Las Vegas’ tallest showgirl installation greets visitors as they enter the south end of Las Vegas city gateway (Contrary to popular belief, most of the Las Vegas strip is technically located in the municipality of Paradise).

The SlotZilla zipline attraction is flanked by oversized, replica showgirls on either side of its zipline apparatus on Fremont Street in downtown Las Vegas.

Las Vegas Productions 
Vegas! The Show celebrates glamorous showgirls, broadway-style singers, dancers and a live big band. Written by show producer and Saxe theater owner David Saxe, whose Folies Bergere showgirl mother brought him backstage.

The other remaining vintage showgirl presentation with feathered costumes and comedy is BurlesQ: The Classic Vegas Showgirl Show. Presented at the Alexis Park Resort, the revue is directed and produced by Cari Byers utilizing her experience as a showgirl with Folies Bergere from 1998 to 2009.

Film and Television 
The 1964 movie Viva Las Vegas, starring Elvis Presley and Ann-Margret, includes a scene filmed in the Tropicana's Fountain Theatre with the Folies Bergere cast.

The television series Designing Women recorded an episode Viva Las Vegas. The plot had Anthony attending the Folies Bergere and falling for the lead singer, Etienne Toussaint. Aired Nov 6, 1992.

Paris Hilton's My New BFF television show, Season 1, Episode 6, Vegas, Baby! Paris Hilton took the remaining girls to Las Vegas to party, Paris Hilton style. Later, the girls competed in a Folies Bergere stage show.

Notable Personnel 

 Hermes Pan was an American dancer and choreographer, principally remembered as Fred Astaire's choreographic collaborator in the acclaimed 1930s movie musicals.
 Michel Gyarmathy became scene and costume designer, art director, manager of and designer of the Folies Bergere of Paris and Las Vegas.
 Vassili Sulich was a ballet master; started Nevada Ballet Theatre (NBT), a regional ballet company.
 Siegfried & Roy were a German-American entertainment duo, best known for their appearances with albino “big cats”.
 Lance Burton is an American stage magician performing primarily in Las Vegas.
 Paul Derval was a movie actor and theater manager of Folies Bergere of Paris. He was attributed to founding both the Paris and Las Vegas productions of Les Folies Bergere.
 Nolan Miller was a costume designer for 1975 Edition and Emmy Award nominee.
 The Halassys - Teeterboard Family Act, performed on the Ed Sullivan Show.
 Erich Brenn was a master at the art of plate spinning, appeared on American television variety and talent shows.
 Gus Augspurg & His Girl Friends - Comedy with baboons, seen on American television.
 The Mecners - Acrobats, presented on American television variety shows.

Editions with Program Credits 
1968 EDITION 

Hotel Tropicana proudly presents

By arrangement with Paul Derval

The Spectacular Folies Bergere

Direct From Paris

Produced by Michel Gyarmathy and Tony Azzi

Conceived and Directed by Michel Gyarmathy

Choreography by Hermes Pan

OVERTURE: Ray Sinatra's Orchestra

SCENE 1. BRAVO...FOLIES!

 Beautes de Folies
 Felicia Atkins
 Carole Clark
 Geri Marmor
 Arlene Hirsh
 Demoiselles de Paris
 Tropicana Dancers
 Jerry Jackson Dancers
 Les Boulevardiers
 Tropicana Boys
 Les Belles de Paris
 Les Mannequins
 Les Chanteurs
 Merlin Singers
 Le Nu de Paris
 Patricia Le Forge
 La Voix de Paris
 Laura Lys
 Les Jumelles de Paris
 Bel Air Sisters

SCENE 2. CONCERT A VERSAILLES

 La Prima Donna
 Laura Lys
 Le Choeur
 Merlin Singers

SCENE 3: THE FEATS OF THE ...HALASSYS

SCENE 4: FEERIE VENITIENNE (Venetian Story)

 La Chasse (The Hunt)
 The Prince - Vassili Sulich
 The Doe - Patricia La Forge
 Les Gondoles
 Laura Lys
 Merlin Singers
 Parade
 Entire Company
 Marriage
 Entire Company

SCENE 5: FLYING SAUCERS...ERICH BRENN

SCENE 6: ARC EN CIEL DE PARIS (Rainbow of Paris)

 Entire Company
 Bel Air Sisters

SCENE 7: GUS AUGSPURG & HIS GIRL FRIENDS

SCENE 8: JEUX D’ECHECS (Chess Game)

 Tropicana Dancers
 Tropicana Boys
 Les Mannequins

SCENE 9: FRENCH QUARTER

 Jerry Jackson Dancers

SCENE 10: LAC D’AMOUR

 Les Patineurs
 Tropicana Dancers
 Tropicana Boys
 L’Amoureux
 Vassili Sulich
 La Fee De La Nuit
 Patricia La Forge
 Les Fees
 Les Mannequins

SCENE 11: LES LAPINS (The Rabbits)

 Tropicana Dancers

SCENE 12: L’ECRAN ENCHANTE (The Magic Screen)

 Jerry Jackson Dancers
 Directed by Tiber and Anna Rudas
 Directed by Richard Tschudin
 Technical Director Paul Szigety

SCENE 13: EXTRAORDINAIRE, ,THE MECNERS

SCENE 14: FRENCH CAN CAN (1900)

 Entire Company

SCENE 15: COMEDY WITH...THE VETERANS

SCENE 16: LE GATEAU DES FOLIES... (Finale)

 Entire Company

PRODUCTION CREDITS

Executive Producer: Tony Azzi

Scenery & Costumes Created By: Michel Gyarmathy

Stage Director and Company Manager: Dave Johnsen

Original Music By: Henri Betti, Paris

Magic Screen & French Quarter Music Arranged By: Bill Reddie

Musical Director: Ray Sinatra

Asst. Choreographer: Jerry Jackson

Lyrics By: Minette Allton

Special Lyrics By: Key Howard

Asst Stage Manager: Kent Heberling

Show Captain: Ruth Christensen

Chief Stage Technician: Robert Smith

Lighting By: Graham T. Bennett

Sound Supervisor: Gordon Hayes

Wardrobe Mistress: Mae Burke

Operations Coordinator: Gilbert Hayes

Property Man: George Shiroky

Scenic Engineer: William Burke, Jr.

References 



Casino hotels
Theater districts in the United States
Showgirls
Production shows in the Las Vegas Valley
1959-related lists
Las Vegas shows
Tropicana Las Vegas
Organized crime in the United States